Arturo Ortiz Santos (born September 18, 1966 in Geneva, Switzerland) is a retired Spanish high jumper.

His personal best jump was 2.34 metres, achieved in June 1991 in Barcelona. This is also the current Spanish record.

Achievements

References

1966 births
Living people
Spanish male high jumpers
Athletes (track and field) at the 1988 Summer Olympics
Athletes (track and field) at the 1992 Summer Olympics
Athletes (track and field) at the 1996 Summer Olympics
Olympic athletes of Spain
Universiade medalists in athletics (track and field)
Mediterranean Games silver medalists for Spain
Mediterranean Games medalists in athletics
Athletes (track and field) at the 1997 Mediterranean Games
Universiade silver medalists for Spain
Universiade bronze medalists for Spain
Medalists at the 1991 Summer Universiade
Medalists at the 1993 Summer Universiade
20th-century Spanish people